Person County Courthouse is a historic courthouse building located at Roxboro, Person County, North Carolina.  It was designed in 1930 by architect Charles C. Hartmann, and is a four-story, rectangular, Classical Revival style tan brick building.  The front facade features paired pilasters with flattened and stylized Corinthian order caps.

It was added to the National Register of Historic Places in 1979.  It is located in the Roxboro Commercial Historic District.

References

County courthouses in North Carolina
Courthouses on the National Register of Historic Places in North Carolina
Neoclassical architecture in North Carolina
Government buildings completed in 1930
Buildings and structures in Person County, North Carolina
National Register of Historic Places in Person County, North Carolina
Historic district contributing properties in North Carolina
1930 establishments in North Carolina